Omorgus badeni is a species of hide beetle in the subfamily Omorginae.

References

badeni
Beetles described in 1872